Phnom Samkos (Samkos Mountain) is the second-highest peak in Cambodia, located in the western Cardamom Mountains at  above sea level. It is situated within the Phnom Samkos Wildlife Sanctuary, which takes its name from the mountain, and the Central Cardamom Protected Forest. The elevation and surrounding forest basin support a large variety of rare flora and fauna.

See also
 Wildlife of Cambodia

References

Mountains of Cambodia
Cardamom Mountains
Geography of Pursat province